Oval track racing is a form of closed-circuit motorsport that is contested on an oval-shaped race track. An oval track differs from a road course in that the layout resembles an oval with turns in only one direction, and the direction of traffic is almost universally counter-clockwise. Oval tracks are dedicated motorsport circuits, used predominantly in the United States. They often have banked turns and some, despite the name, are not precisely oval, and the shape of the track can vary.

Major forms of oval track racing include stock car racing, open-wheel racing, sprint car racing, modified car racing, midget car racing and dirt track motorcycles.

Oval track racing is the predominant form of auto racing in the United States. According to the 2013 National Speedway Directory, the total number of oval tracks, drag strips and road courses in the United States is 1,262, with 901 of those being oval tracks and 683 of those being dirt tracks. Among the most famous oval tracks in North America are the Indianapolis Motor Speedway, Daytona International Speedway and Talladega Superspeedway.

Oval racing

Pack racing

Pack racing is a phenomenon found on fast, high-banked superspeedways. It occurs when the vehicles racing are cornering at their limit of aerodynamic drag, but within their limit of traction. This allows drivers to race around the track constantly at wide open throttle. Since the vehicles are within their limit of traction, drafting through corners will not hinder a vehicle's performance. As cars running together are faster than cars running individually, all cars in the field will draft each other simultaneously in one large pack. In stock car racing this is often referred to as "restrictor plate racing" because NASCAR mandates that each car on its two longest high-banked ovals, Talladega and Daytona, use an air restrictor to reduce horsepower.

The results of pack racing may vary. As drivers are forced to race in a confined space, overtaking is very common as vehicles may travel two and three abreast. This forces drivers to use strong mental discipline in negotiating traffic. There are drawbacks, however. Should an accident occur at the front of the pack, the results could block the track in a short amount of time. This leaves drivers at the back of the pack with little time to react and little room to maneuver. The results are often catastrophic as numerous cars may be destroyed in a single accident. This type of accident is often called "The Big One".

Comparison with road racing
Oval track racing requires different tactics than road racing. While the driver doesn't have to shift gears nearly as frequently, brake as heavily or as often, or deal with turns of various radii in both directions as in road racing, drivers are still challenged by negotiating the track. Where there is generally one preferred line around a road course, there are many different lines that can work on an oval track. The preferred line depends on many factors including track conditions, car set-up, and traffic. The oval track driver must choose which line to use each time they approach a corner. On a short track in a 25-lap feature race, a driver might not run any two laps with the same line. Both types of racing place physical demands on the driver. A driver in an IndyCar race at Richmond International Raceway may be subject to as many lateral g-forces (albeit in only one direction) as a Formula One driver at Silverstone.

Weather also plays a different role in each discipline. Road racing offers a variety of fast and slow corners that allow the use of rain tires. Paved oval tracks generally don't run with a wet track surface. Dirt ovals will sometimes support a light rain. Some tracks (e.g., Evergreen Speedway in Monroe, WA) have "rain or shine" rules requiring races to be run in the rain.

Safety has also been a point of difference between the two. While a road course usually has abundant run-off areas, gravel traps, and tire barriers, oval tracks usually have a concrete retaining wall separating the track from the fans. Innovations have been made to change this, however. The SAFER barrier was created to provide a less dangerous alternative to a traditional concrete wall. The barrier can be retrofitted onto an existing wall or may take the place of a concrete wall completely.

Track classification 
Oval tracks are classified based upon their size, surface, banking, and shape.

By size 
Their size can range from only a few hundred feet to over two and a half miles.  The definitions used to differentiate track sizes have changed over the years. While some tracks use terms such as "speedway" or "superspeedway" in their name, they may not meet the specific definitions used in this article.

Short track 

A short track is an oval track less than one mile (1.6 km) long, with the majority being 0.5 miles (0.8 km) or shorter. Drivers seeking careers in oval track racing generally serve their apprenticeship on short tracks before moving up to series which compete on larger tracks. Due to their short length and fast action, these tracks are often nicknamed "bullrings". Professional-level NASCAR races on short tracks usually use a 500-lap or 400-lap distance. Short tracks in many cases have lights installed and routinely host night races. The short ovals still form the backbone of NASCAR in the feeder series. Three race tracks of this type are also represented in the Cup: Bristol, Martinsville and Richmond. At the request of some fans on social media, there are plans to hold more races on this oval type in the future. Tracks with potential for future cup races are the Iowa Speedway built in 2006, the Nashville Fairgrounds Speedway used until 1984 in the Cup, and the Memphis Motorsports Park, which had races of the Busch Series back then until the 2000s. The Auto Club Speedway is to be converted from a 2-mile super speedway to a 1/2 mile short track in 2024.

Mile oval 
Synonymous with the name, a 1-mile (1.61 km) oval is a popular and common length for oval track racing. The exact measurements, however, can vary by as much as a tenth of a mile and still fall into this category. Most mile ovals are relatively flat-banked, with Dover being a notable exception.

Many 1-mile dirt ovals were used by Stock cars or Champcars before race tracks with dirt surfaces were removed from the racing calendar in the early 1970s. Many of these racetracks got the nickname "Fairgrounds” — for example Arizona State Fairgrounds, California State Fairgrounds and Michigan State Fairgrounds Speedway. The origin of these racetracks was in harness racing, which commonly used 1-mile tracks. Also, the oldest oval race track, the Milwaukee Mile was originally a race track for horse racing.

In NASCAR, 1-mile oval tracks are among the intermediate tracks. IndyCar rated these tracks as short ovals, since IndyCar does not usually run on ovals shorter than 3/4-mile. The 1-mile ovals have lost a great deal of their former importance for oval racing. Most of the racetracks abandoned by NASCAR or IndyCar in the 2000s were of this type. These include the Chicago Motor Speedway and the Walt Disney World Speedway, which were built during the 1990s construction boom but used for only four years. The historic Nazareth Speedway, which was paved in 1986, was completely abandoned after the 2004 season. Physically, the Milwaukee Mile, the oldest oval race track in the world, as well as the Rockingham Speedway and the Pikes Peak International Raceway still exist. However, these racetracks have not been used by nationally important motorsports events for years. There are only three 1-milers left on the NASCAR racing calendar: Phoenix, Loudon, and Dover. IndyCar has not raced on an oval of this length since 2018.

Intermediate 

Also referred to with the general term of "speedway", these courses are 1 to 2 miles (1.6 to 3.2 km) in length, but the term is particularly reserved for 1.5-mile (2.4 km) tracks. At the beginning of the history of NASCAR and IndyCar, this oval size was not very common. Until 1990, there were only five examples. Two of these, the Marchbanks Speedway (1.4 miles) and the Trenton Speedway (1.5 miles), were demolished in the 1970s and 1980s, and only three—Charlotte Motor Speedway, Atlanta Motor Speedway and Darlington Raceway—have survived to this day. All other ovals of this type were built after 1994. During the race track construction boom of the late 1990s, these tracks began to be labeled with the rather derogatory term "cookie cutter" tracks, as their differences were perceived to be minimal.

In 1992, Charlotte became the first intermediate track to install lights and allow for night racing. It is now commonplace for these types of tracks to host night races. Intermediate tracks usually have moderate to steep banking. Almost all modern race tracks that are still used in NASCAR and IndyCar today are of this type. Since their size allows them to compromise high speeds with sightlines, especially tri- and quad-ovals of 1.5-mile length have become commonplace in major racing series that use oval tracks.

While intermediate speedways were designed primarily with stock cars in mind, they were also believed to be suited to host Indy cars as well. In the early years of the Indy Racing League, the series visited several intermediate tracks. The higher-downforce, normally aspirated IRL-type cars proved to be competitive at several of the tracks. The CART series however, mostly stayed away as the faster, more powerful Champ Cars were generally thought to be too fast for this type of circuit. This became evident at the 2001 Firestone Firehawk 600, when drivers experienced vertigo-like symptoms, and the race was cancelled for safety reasons. As of 2020, the IndyCar Series has only one race remaining at a high-banked intermediate track (Texas). These tracks began to be removed from the Indy car schedule in the late-2000s and early-2010s due to low crowds and serious crashes, including the fatal accident involving Dan Wheldon at Las Vegas in 2011.

Superspeedway 
Originally a superspeedway was an oval race track with a length of one mile or more. Since the introduction of the intermediate oval, Superspeedway is an oval race course of 2 miles or longer. These tracks were built in 1909 and 1959 respectively. Indianapolis Motor Speedway was built as a facility for the automotive industry to conduct research and development. Daytona International Speedway was built as a replacement for the Daytona Beach Road Course, which combined the town's main street and its famous beach. Daytona hosts the Daytona 500, NASCAR's most prestigious race, while the Indianapolis Motor Speedway is home to the Indianapolis 500 and the Brickyard 400.

The longest superspeedway is the Talladega Superspeedway in Talladega, Alabama. Daytona and Talladega are the pinnacle of stock car superspeedway racing, where restrictor plates are mandated by the sport's ruling body to reduce the high speeds accommodated by their steep banking since 1988.

Other superspeedways used by NASCAR include the Michigan International Speedway (2.0 miles), Auto Club Speedway (known as California Speedway prior to February 2008) (2.0 miles), and Pocono Raceway (2.5 miles). Auto Club Speedway and Michigan are often considered intermediate tracks by NASCAR due to their similarities with 1.5-mile tracks, while Pocono and Indianapolis are sometimes classified separately, as they are the only long, flat tracks on the schedule. Due to the low number of spectators or safety concerns by the drivers, IndyCar will no longer drive super speedways outside of Indianapolis. Michigan Speedway was part of the series from 2002 to 2007, AutoClub Speedway from 2002 to 2005 and a second time from 2012 to 2015, Pocono was used by IndyCar between 2014 and 2019. In NASCAR they are still an essential part of the racing calendar.

The closed and partially demolished Texas World Speedway, was the original "sister track" to Michigan. No major professional series have raced at TWS since the 1990s.

The 2.5 mile Ontario Motor Speedway was known as the "Indianapolis of the West", but was bought by the Chevron Land Company in 1980 and partitioned for development.

Track length disputes 
NASCAR and IndyCar use different measuring systems to measure the oval race tracks. As a result, the racetracks have lengths of different accuracy. The following table shows the values that NASCAR, IndyCar and CART/CCWS used to determine the lap speeds and track records.

By shape 
A typical oval track consists of two parallel straights, connected by two 180° turns. Although most ovals generally have only two radii curves, they are usually advertised and labeled as four 90° turns. While many oval tracks conform to the traditional symmetrical design, asymmetrical tracks are not uncommon.

Classical geometric shapes 

Additional prominent examples:

Tri-ovals 

The tri-oval is the common shape of the ovals from the construction booms of the 1960s and 1990s. The use of the tri-oval shape for automobile racing was conceived by Bill France, Sr. during the planning for Daytona. The triangular layout allowed fans in the grandstands an angular perspective of the cars coming towards and moving away from their vantage point. Traditional ovals (such as Indianapolis) offered only limited linear views of the course, and required fans to look back and forth much like a tennis match. The tri-oval shape prevents fans from having to "lean" to see oncoming cars, and creates more forward sight lines. The modern tri-ovals were often called as cookie cutters because of their (nearly) identical shape and identical kind of races.

Additional prominent examples:

Unique shapes 
There are a lot of oval tracks, which neither have a classical geometric shape nor still represent a modern tri-oval in the strict sense. While these courses still technically fall under the category of ovals, their unique shape, flat corners, hard braking zones, or increased difficulty, often produces driving characteristics similar to those of a road course.

Concentric oval track / legends oval 
Some facilities feature several ovals track of different sizes, often sharing part of the same front straightaway. The now defunct Ascot Speedway featured 1/2 mile and 1/4 mile dirt oval tracks, and Irwindale Speedway features 1/2 mile and 1/3 mile concentric paved oval tracks. Pocono Raceway once had a 3/4 mile oval which connected to the main stretch, and circled around the garage area.

In 1991, Charlotte Motor Speedway connected the quad oval start-finish straight to the pit lane with two 180 degree turns, resulting in a concentric 1/4-mile oval layout. The 1/4-mile layout became a popular venue for legends car racing. The name "legends oval" was derived from this use. They have also seen use with go-karts, short track stock cars, and other lower disciplines. This idea was adopted by numerous tracks including Texas Motor Speedway, Atlanta Motor Speedway, Kentucky Speedway, Las Vegas Motor Speedway, and Iowa Speedway which has a 1/8 mile version.

Perhaps the most unusual concentric oval facility is Dover Speedway-Dover Downs. The one-mile oval track encompasses a 0.625-mile harness racing track inside.

By Banking / Superelevation 

Oval tracks usually have slope in both straight and in curves, but the slope on the straights is less, circuits without any slope are rare to find, low-slope are usually old or small tracks, high gradient are more common in new circuits.

Circuits like Milwaukee Mile and Indianapolis Motor Speedway have 9° banking in the turns and are considered low banked, superspeedways like Talladega have up to 33° of tilt in curves, Daytona has up to 32°, both are considered high banked. Atlanta is the intermediate track with the highest banking, 28°. Winchester has the highest banking of any active oval track with 37°

By Surface 

Track surfaces can be dirt, concrete, asphalt, or a combination of concrete and asphalt. Some ovals in the early twentieth century had wood surfaces. Indianapolis Motor Speedway's track surface used to be made entirely of bricks, and today, 3 feet (0.91 m), or one yard, of original bricks remain exposed at the start-finish line. Each was hand laid over a 2-inch (51 mm) cushion of sand, then leveled and the gaps filled with mortar. Before the work was completed, locals nicknamed the track "The Brickyard".

Combined road course

A Combined road course, colloquially referred to as a "roval" (a blend word combining "road course" and "oval") is an oval track racing facility that features a road course in the infield (and/or outfield), that is usually linked to the oval circuit. This type of course makes for a multi-purpose track, and allows the facility to be used for both oval and road racing. A typical combined road course consists of the oval portion of the track, using the same start/finish line, and same pit area, but a mid-course diversion to a winding road circuit in the infield (and/or outfield). At some point, the circuit leads back to the main oval, and completes the rest of the lap. On some of the faster ovals, a chicane is present on long back-straights, to keep speeds down, and create additional braking/passing zones. Some more complex facilities feature a stand-alone road course layout(s) in the infield not directly linked to the oval layout, or otherwise using only a short portion of the oval.

Combined road courses combine the high speed characteristics of ovals with the technical precision of road courses. It allows road racing disciplines the unique experience of being held in the stadium style atmosphere of an oval superspeedway. Numerous combined road courses saw widespread use with sports cars in the 1970s and early 1980s. However, their use at the professional level has since diminished considerably, since most layouts lacked the desirable topography and competitive challenges of natural road courses. In addition, most combined road course circuits offer poor sightlines for fans sitting in the grandstands. Oftentimes the challenging infield portion is obscured or not visible at all from the grandstands that line the circumference of the oval track, so many fans choose to view from the ground level inside the infield – leaving the grandstands mostly empty and unsightly.

Many combined road course layouts have been abandoned, or are used only for testing and amateur race meets. Since 1962, the most famous race continuously held on a combined road course has been the 24 Hours of Daytona.

Since 2018, NASCAR has held the Bank of America Roval 400 on a combined course at the Charlotte Motor Speedway.

In some rare examples, the combined road course layout is run in the opposite direction to the oval circuit. For instance, at Indianapolis the oval is run counter-clockwise, but the combined road course used during the IndyCar Series Grand Prix of Indianapolis is run clockwise. However the  MotoGP  races were run counter-clockwise, with some reconfigured corners to fix corner apex problems. Michigan was also an example of a clockwise combined road course. Another example is the Adelaide International Raceway in Australia which combines a 2.41 km (1.50 mi) road course with an 0.805 km (0.500 mi) speedway bowl. The Bowl forms a permanent part of the road course and also runs clockwise. At many tracks, multiple configurations are available for the combined road course layout(s).

An example of an outfield combined road course can be seen at the Calder Park Raceway in Melbourne, Australia. The Calder Park complex has a 1.119 mi (1.801 km) high-banked oval speedway called the Thunderdome as well as a separate road course. The road course and the oval can be linked via two short roads that connect the front straight of the road course to the back straight of the oval. As they are separate tracks, this creates a unique situation where different races can actually be run on both the oval and the full road course at the same time. Also unique is that unlike most combined circuits which use the oval track's start/finish line and pits, in the case of Calder Park it is the road course start/finish line and pits that are used. This configuration was used only twice (both in 1987) and has not been used for major motor racing since hosting Round 9 of the 1987 World Touring Car Championship.

Oval track construction booms in North America
There have been two distinct oval race track construction "booms" in the United States. The first took place in the 1960s, and the second took place in the mid-to-late 1990s. The majority of tracks from the 1960s boom and the 1990s boom have survived, but some tracks failed to achieve long-term financial success. Incidentally, these two booms loosely coincided with the similar construction boom of the baseball/football cookie-cutter stadiums of the 1960s and 1970s, and the subsequent sport-specific stadium construction boom that began in the 1990s.

Tracks built during the 1960s boom
Daytona International Speedway (1959)
Charlotte Motor Speedway (1960)
Atlanta Motor Speedway (1960; substantially reconstructed in 1997; reprofiled in 2022)
North Carolina Motor Speedway (1965; demoted to primarily a test/amateur facility since 2005)
Dover International Speedway (1966)
Michigan International Speedway (1968)
Texas World Speedway (1969; primarily amateur racing and testing from 1981–2016; closed 2017, demolished in 2020)
Talladega Superspeedway (1969)
Ontario Motor Speedway (1970; demolished in 1980)
Pocono Raceway (1971)

Tracks built during the 1990s boom
Homestead-Miami Speedway (1995)
Las Vegas Motor Speedway (1996)
Texas Motor Speedway (1996)
Gateway International Raceway (1997)
Pikes Peak International Raceway (1997; hosting only non-major events since 2008)
Auto Club Speedway (1997; will be reconfigured in 2024)
Kansas Speedway (2001)
Chicagoland Speedway (2001; closed in 2020 due to COVID-19 pandemic, no race in 2021 & 2022, set to reopen with SuperMotorcross)
Nashville Superspeedway (2001; closed 2011, reopened 2021)
Iowa Speedway (2006; closed in 2020 due to COVID-19 pandemic, held only ARCA Menards Series in 2021, IndyCar to return in 2022)

Track built during the 1990s that have been closed or demolished
Walt Disney World Speedway (1996; demolished 2015–2016)
Chicago Motor Speedway (1999; demolished in 2009)
Kentucky Speedway (2000; no race in 2021, 2022 & 2023)
Memphis International Raceway (1998; closed in 2022; is to be demolished)

International oval tracks 
Most of the oval tracks are located in the USA, in Mexico and Canada. However, there are also many oval tracks elsewhere too, as listed below.

Current
 Adelaide International Raceway in Australia,  short track
 Autodrome de Linas-Montlhéry in France,  intermediate oval
 Autódromo Internacional de Luanda in Angola, 3.208 kilometres (1.993 mi) rectangular oval
 Autódromo Ciudad de Rafaela in Argentina,  superspeedway
 Bahrain International Circuit in Bahrain,  intermediate oval
 Calder Park Thunderdome in Australia,  intermediate quad-oval
 EuroSpeedway Lausitz in Germany,  triangular superspeedway
 Highlands Motorsport Park in New Zealand,  short track
 Mallory Park in the United Kingdom,  intermediate oval
 Penbay International Circuit in Taiwan,  intermediate tri-oval
 Phakisa Freeway in South Africa,  D-shaped intermediate oval
 Raceway Venray in the Netherlands,  short track
 Tours Speedway in France,  temporary short track
 Twin Ring Motegi in Japan,  egg-shaped intermediate oval

Former
 Brooklands in the United Kingdom,  kidney-bean-shaped high banked superspeedway
 Emerson Fittipaldi Speedway in Brasil,  trapezoid intermediate oval
 Rockingham Motor Speedway in the United Kingdom,  trapezoid intermediate oval

See also
Dragstrip
List of paved ovals in Canada
List of paved ovals in Mexico
List of paved ovals in the US

References

Auto racing by type
Stock car racing
Open wheel racing